Iotapa (born around 20 BC-unknown date of death) was a princess of Commagene, daughter of King Mithridates III of Commagene, Queen consort of Syrian King Sampsiceramus II of Emesa.

Biography 
Iotapa was a princess from the Kingdom of Commagene, who lived in the second half of the 1st century BC and the first half of the 1st century. She was one of the daughters of King Mithridates III of Commagene and Queen Iotapa of Commagene. Iotapa was of Armenian, Greek and Median descent. She was most probably born, raised and educated in Samosata, the capital of the Kingdom of Commagene.

Iotapa married the King Sampsiceramus II from the Royal family of Emesa, Syria, who ruled from 14 to 42. Through her marriage to Sampsiceramus II, she became Queen of Emesa.

Iotapa with Sampsiceramus II had four children; two daughters: Iotapa, Mamaea and two sons: Gaius Julius Azizus, Gaius Julius Sohaemus.

From a surviving inscription dated from the reign of her husband, Sampsiceramus II along with Iotapa are known as a happy couple.

Sources
 H. Temporini & W. Haase, 2, Principat: 9, 2, Volume 8, Walter de Gruyter, 1978

 Levick, Barbara (2007). Julia Domna, Syrian Empress, Taylor & Francis
 Royal Egyptian Genealogy: Ptolemaic Descendants

References

See also
 Iotapa (disambiguation)

Princesses of Commagene
Ancient queens consort
Year of death missing
People from Homs
1st-century BC women
1st-century women
People from Roman Anatolia
Roman client rulers
Emesene dynasty
Year of birth unknown